Jan Hertrich-Woleński (also known as Jan Woleński; born 21 September 1940) is a Polish philosopher specializing in the history of the Lwów–Warsaw school of logic and in analytic philosophy.

He has spent most of his academic career at the Jagiellonian University in Kraków, where he is currently professor emeritus. His main fields of research are logic, epistemology, and the history of philosophy in Poland.

Life
Jan Woleński was born in Radom, Poland on 21 September 1940. His first interest was law and he began studies at Jagiellonian University in 1958. Soon philosophy drew his attention and by 1963 he was employed in the Department of State and Law as an assistant professor. He looked to analytical jurisprudence in the United Kingdom, and with the guidance of Professor Kazimierz Opalek, in 1968 he produced his thesis. Continuing his ascent, he produced a Habilitation in 1972: Problems in the Interpretations of Law. In 1974 he straddled two positions: the Institute of Social Sciences at the Academy of Mining and Metallurgy, and lecturer on philosophy of science at the Institute of Philosophy at Jagiellonian University.

Wroclaw Polytechnic called him to teach in their Institute of Social Sciences in 1979. As an opponent of the state socialism governing Poland, Woleński edited an underground bulletin Riposte. Though he was appointed director of the Institute, he was removed after four months for his resistance. The journal Studia Logica engaged him as editor from 1987 to 1993. It was in 1988 that he gained appointment to the Institute of Philosophy at his alma mater. He became professor ordinarius in 1990 and chair of the Department of Epistemology in 1994.

Other editing positions include Synthese from 1990, The Monist from 1993, Studies in Eastern European Thought from 1993, Axiomathes from 1992, and the Synthese Library of Kluwer Academic. Woleński was president of the Polish Society of Logic and Philosophy of Science (1999 to 2002). "Jan Woleński has achieved success as a teacher and advisor, encompassing the supervision of fourteen doctoral dissertations. Among his graduates are professors of philosophy as well as of law."

He is on the consulting board of the philosophy journal, Theoria.

Institute Vienna Circle held a conference in 1997 on the Austro-Polish connections in logical empiricism. Woleński described the semantic theory of truth in his introductory essay, "Semantic Revolution – Rudolf Carnap, Kurt Gödel, Alfred Tarski". It was followed by a score of contributions from philosophers. Working with Eckehart Köhler, Wolenski edited the papers and the collection was published as Alfred Tarski and the Vienna Circle.

In 2013 Woleński was awarded the Prize of the Foundation for Polish Science for a comprehensive analysis of the work of the Lwów-Warsaw school and for placing its achievements within the context of international discourse in contemporary philosophy.

Woleński was a plenary speaker at the second world congress on religion and logic held in Warsaw, June 18 to 22, 2017. He has continued academic involvement at the University of Information Technology and Management in Rzeszów Poland.

Personal
Woleński is active in Poland's atheist movement.  In the 1960s he was a member of the government-sponsored  Association of Atheists and Freethinkers, and since 2007 he is a member of the Honorary Committee of the Polish Rationalist Association.  He is widely recognized in Poland as an atheist and has promoted the replacement of religion classes with philosophy classes in Polish schools.

Woleński is involved in the secular Jewish movement, writing on the common Polish-Jewish past and on today's Polish-Jewish relations.  He is a member of B'nai B'rith and was deputy president of its Polish chapter from 2007 to 2012.

He was a member of the Polish United Workers Party (the Polish communist party) from 1965 to 1981.  From 1980 to 1990 he was a member of the Solidarity (Polish trade union) movement.

Works

In English and French 
 
 
 
 
 
 
 Woleński, Jan, Essays on Logic and Its Applications in Philosophy, Peter Lang, Frankfurt am Main 2011;
 Woleński, Jan, L’école de Lvov-Varsovie : Philosophie et logique en Pologne (1895-1939),  Vrin, Paris 2011;
 Woleński, Jan, Historico-Philosophical Essays, v. 1, Copernicus Center Press, Kraków 2013;
 Woleński, Jan, Logic and Its Philosophy, Peter Lang, Berlin 2018;
 Woleński, Jan, Semantics and Truth, Springer Nature, Heidelberg 2019;

In Polish
 Woleński, Jan (1980). Z zagadnień analitycznej filozofii prawa, Quaestiones ad philosophiam analyticam iuris pertinentes, Warsaw, PWN.
 Woleński, Jan (1985). Filozoficzna szkoła lwowsko-warszawska, Warsaw, PWN. 
 Woleński, Jan (1990). Kotarbiński, Wiedza Powszechna, Warsaw. 
 Woleński, Jan (1993). Metamatematyka a epistemologia, Warsaw, PWN.
 Woleński, Jan (1996). W stronę logiki, Aureus, Cracow.
 Woleński, Jan (1997). Szkoła Lwowsko-Warszawska w polemikach, Warsaw, Scholar.
 Woleński, Jan (1999). Okolice filozofii prawa, Cracow, Universitas. 
 Woleński, Jan (2000). Epistemologia, 3 volumes, Cracow, Aureus (reedited in one volume in 2005 by WN PWN, Warsaw).
 Woleński, Jan (2004). Granice niewiary, Cracow, Wydawnictwo Literackie.

See also
 History of philosophy in Poland
 List of Poles

References

External links
 Works by Woleński from PhilPapers
 Humanism and Rationalism
 
 Short film about Woleński made by Foundation for Polish Science
 "Czy Bóg jest potrzebny do wyjaśnienia świata?—debata między Janem Woleńskim i Jackiem Wojtysiakiem" ("Is God Necessary to Explain the World?–a debate between Jan Woleński and Jacek Wojtysiak")
 Jagiellonian University's Holocaust Research Centre website

Atheist philosophers
Polish atheists
20th-century Polish Jews
20th-century Polish philosophers
21st-century Polish Jews
Jewish philosophers
Jewish atheists
Analytic philosophers
1940 births
Living people
Academic staff of Jagiellonian University